Hünxe is a municipality in the district of Wesel, in North Rhine-Westphalia, Germany. It is part of the Rhine-Waal euroregion

Geography

Hünxe is located approximately 10 km east of Wesel and 9 km north of Dinslaken. The neighbouring municipalities are: Schermbeck, Dorsten, Bottrop, Dinslaken, Voerde, Wesel und Hamminkeln.
The most part of the municipality belongs to the natural park Hohe Mark. The river Lippe and the Wesel–Datteln Canal cross the municipality.

Area 
The municipality of Hünxe spans over an area of 106,80 km². It is divided into the six subdivisions of Hünxe, Bruckhausen, Bucholtwelmen, Drevenack, Gartrop-Bühl and Krudenburg.

People 
 Rainer Keller (1965-2022), German politician (SPD)

References

External links 

Wesel (district)